Brachydiplax duivenbodei is a species of dragonfly in the family Libellulidae.
It is known by the common name darkmouth. It is native to Indonesia, the Solomon Islands, and Queensland in Australia.

Description
Males of this species are typical in colour for the genus, being bright powder blue on both the thorax and abdomen whereas females lack the pruinescence. The labrum is brown to black, thus giving the species its common name of darkmouth, as opposed to the similar palemouth (Brachydiplax denticauda). This species usually has seven antenodal crossveins in the fore-wing and six antenodal crossveins in the hind-wing. It is small in size with a wingspan of 40 to 60 millimeters. Though brightly coloured, the males often go unnoticed by an observer once they land on a lily pad or similar place.

Habitat
This species can be found in habitat with still and slow-moving waters.

Gallery

References

Libellulidae
Odonata of Oceania
Odonata of Australia
Insects of Indonesia
Taxa named by Friedrich Moritz Brauer
Insects described in 1866